Our Country's Voice Is Calling is a World War I march for voice and piano with drums and bugles ad libitum, written by O. Ebel and Luella Stewart with music by O. Ebel. The song was first published in 1917 by Chandler-Ebel Music Co., in Brooklyn, NY.

The sheet music can be found at the Pritzker Military Museum & Library.

References

Bibliography
Parker, Bernard S. World War I Sheet Music Vol 2. Jefferson: McFarland & Company, Inc., 2007. . 
Vogel, Frederick G. World War I Songs: A History and Dictionary of Popular American Patriotic Tunes, with Over 300 Complete Lyrics. Jefferson: McFarland & Company, Inc., 1995. . 

Songs about the United States
1917 songs
Songs of World War I